Anthony Johns is an American boxer from Newark, New Jersey. He was the 2019 National Golden Gloves Champion in the Light flyweight division.

Johns was a New Jersey Golden Gloves Championship four-time winner and New Jersey Diamond Gloves Championship four-time winner. He was inducted into the New Jersey Boxing Hall of Fame. Johns' father, Anthony Williams, is trainer.

References 

Boxers from Newark, New Jersey
American male boxers
African-American boxers
Flyweight boxers
Living people
National Golden Gloves champions
Year of birth missing (living people)
21st-century African-American people